Jasey-Jay Anderson (born 13 April 1975 in Val-Morin, Quebec) is a Canadian snowboarder and Olympic gold medallist, who competed in the 1998, 2002, 2006, 2010, 2014, 2018, Winter Olympics. Anderson currently resides in Mont-Tremblant outside of Montreal.

Personal life
When he is not snowboarding, Anderson lives on a blueberry farm in Mont-Tremblant, Quebec.
Since 2007, Jasey-Jay is part of the Tremblant athletes ambassadors program.

Sports career
Anderson is Canada's most decorated snowboarder having achieved a World Championship gold medal in all 3 slalom events over his career, and an Olympic gold medal in parallel giant slalom. In addition to being a 4 time world champion Anderson has achieved success across the board. Anderson won four consecutive overall FIS Snowboard World Cup titles from 2000 to 2004 and two world cup overall titles in snowboard cross in 2001–02 and 2005–06. These titles included 20 podiums in parallel giant slalom and 19 podiums in snowboard cross.

Anderson is also a six-time Olympic athlete, having represented Canada in the 1998 Nagano, 2002 Salt Lake, 2006 Turin, 2010 Vancouver, 2014 Sochi, 2018 PyeongChang, Winter Olympic games.

Anderson's best result in the Olympics prior to Vancouver 2010 was a 5th-place finish in snowboard cross in Turin. Anderson finished 20th in the parallel giant slalom event at the 2006 Turin games.

Anderson won the gold medal in men's parallel giant slalom at the 2010 Winter Olympics on home soil as the games took place in Vancouver, British Columbia, Canada.

Anderson retired following the Vancouver 2010 Olympics but returned to snowboarding to compete in the Sochi 2014 Olympics, where he was the oldest competitor and ultimately finished in fourteenth position.

In January 2018, at age 42, he became the oldest snowboarder to compete at a World Cup. Anderson qualified for the PyeongChang Olympics. With his participation at the 2018 Winter Olympics, he became the oldest competitor in snowboarding, and the Canadian with the most appearances at the Winter Olympics, becoming a 6-time Winter Olympian.

References

External links
 National Team Profile
 CTV Olympic Profile
 

Canadian farmers
Canadian male snowboarders
Olympic snowboarders of Canada
Olympic gold medalists for Canada
Snowboarders at the 1998 Winter Olympics
Snowboarders at the 2002 Winter Olympics
Snowboarders at the 2006 Winter Olympics
Snowboarders at the 2010 Winter Olympics
Snowboarders at the 2014 Winter Olympics
Snowboarders at the 2018 Winter Olympics
1975 births
Living people
Anglophone Quebec people
People from Laurentides
Olympic medalists in snowboarding
Medalists at the 2010 Winter Olympics
Sportspeople from Quebec